Her Excellency is a musical comedy composed by Manning Sherwin and Harold Purcell from a book by Archie Menzies and Max Kester. A couple of the songs were composed by Harry Parr-Davies. The story takes place entirely in the British Embassy in the fictional San Barcellos.

After premiering at the Alhambra Theatre, Glasgow, the show transferred to London's West End enjoying a run of 252 performances between 22 June 1949 and 28 January 1950, initially at the London Hippodrome before switching to the Saville Theatre. It was written as a starring vehicle for Cicely Courtneidge and produced by her husband Jack Hulbert. The cast also included Patrick Barr, Austin Trevor, Thorley Walters, Billy Dainty and Tucker McGuire.

References

Bibliography
 Wearing, J.P. The London Stage 1940-1949: A Calendar of Productions, Performers, and Personnel.  Rowman & Littlefield, 2014.

1949 musicals
British musicals
West End musicals